PF-4840154 is a pyrimidine derivative discovered by Pfizer at its Sandwich, Kent research center. The compound is a potent, selective activator of both the human (EC50 = 23 nM) and rat (EC50 = 97 nM) TRPA1 channels. This compound elicits nociception in a mouse model through TRPA1 activation. PF-4840154 is used as a reference agonist of the TRPA1 channel for in-vitro high-throughput screening purposes, and is superior to allyl isothiocyanate for this use. The TRPA1 channel is considered an attractive pain target based on the fact that TRPA1 knockout mice showed near complete attenuation of pain behaviors in some pre-clinical development models.

See also
 ASP-7663
 JT-010

References

Transient receptor potential channel agonists
Aminopyrimidines
Pfizer brands
Tetrahydropyrans
Piperazines
Nociception